Take Me Apart is the debut studio album by American singer and songwriter Kelela. It was released on October 6, 2017, through Warp. Combining electronic music and R&B, the album was noted for its futuristic sound and its incorporation of various musical styles. Kelela worked on the album for four years with producers she had previously collaborated with on her previous releases, Cut 4 Me (2013) and Hallucinogen (2015).

The album received widespread acclaim from music critics, many of whom commended its innovative production and Kelela's sharp songwriting and vocal delivery. It appeared on several publications' lists of the year's best albums. The album was supported by the singles "LMK", "Frontline", "Waitin" and "Blue Light".

Development and production
Kelela worked on Take Me Apart for four years, alongside Arca and Jam City, whom she had previously worked with on Hallucinogen and Cut 4 Me respectively. She stated that they "anchored" the album and produced the bulk of it. On February 18, 2016, Kelela featured on a short film by Dazed named "Interlude", which contained new material that would later turn out to be snippets of tracks included in the album. In a press release, Kelela explained that the album expresses "an honest vision of how we navigate dissolving ties with each other and yet remain sanguine for the next chance at love," continuing: "despite it being a personal record, the politics of my identity informs how it sounds and how I choose to articulate my vulnerability and strength. I am a black woman, a second-generation Ethiopian-American, who grew up in the 'burbs listening to R&B, jazz and Björk. All of it comes out in one way or another."

Composition
The music of Take Me Apart was described as electro-R&B and alternative R&B, with several critics noting its incorporation of various other musical styles, including electronica, jazz, soul, UK garage and dance-pop. The Guardian described the album as "glitchy R&B",  while also stating that the album offers "tracks that are both pop-minded and gratifyingly future-facing." Clash labeled it as "cavernous, avant-garde R&B that moves the body and heals the broken heart." Fact called the album "a genre-melding journey," and said it has "a subtle, playful Afro-futurist vision." DIY noted the usage of "glacial synths" and "trap beats," in contrast to Consequence of Sound who commended the producers for "their refusal to use trap as a crutch." The Skinny added that the album differs from the "heavy, industrial beats" from Kelela's previous releases, despite many of the same producers appearing on this album. The album was also said to evoke the music of Janet Jackson and Björk, whom Kelela named as influences. Lyrically, the album deals with various themes, such as love, romance, sex, impatience, vulnerability, the rewards and pitfalls of relationships, and "the complicated things that can happen when complicated people try to understand each other."

The album's tracks were produced by a number of different producers including Jam City, Arca, Bok Bok, Kingdom, Dubbel Dutch, Al Shux and Ariel Rechtshaid. All tracks were mixed by Kwes, and vocals were recorded and engineered by Chris Kasych.

Release and promotion
The title of the album was announced on July 14, 2017. The cover art was revealed two weeks later, with the album being made available for pre-order the following day alongside the release of "LMK". A tour in support of the album was announced later that month. It kicked off in September and includes dates in North America and Europe, as well as three dates in Australia with the xx and Earl Sweatshirt in January 2018.

On October 27, 2017, Kelela shared a trailer of an upcoming film in support of the album titled "All It Took", directed and produced by Wu Tsang.

Singles
The lead single, "LMK", was released on August 1, alongside the pre-order of the album. The song premiered on Zane Lowe's Beats 1 show.

"Frontline" was premiered on September 4 on the HBO series Insecure, and was later released for digital download and streaming services as the album's second single. The Fader said that in the song Kelela is "leaving behind someone who was holding her back, and she's not looking to apologize. It's not a cold track, though, but one about how certain significant decisions can be made easier with a strong knowledge of self-worth." An animated music video for the song was released on February 28, 2018.

"Waitin" was released as the third single on October 3, and "Blue Light" was released the following day as the fourth single. A music video for the song was released on November 7.

Take Me a_Part, the Remixes
On September 12, 2018, announced a remix album titled Take Me a_Part, the Remixes alongside the "LMK (What's Really Good)" remix featuring Princess Nokia, Junglepussy, Cupcakke, Linn da Quebrada and Ms. Boogie. The album was released on October 5, making it one year since the release of Take Me Apart. It features contributions from Kaytranada, Rare Essence, Serpentwithfeet and more.

Critical reception

At Metacritic, which assigns a normalized rating out of 100 to reviews from mainstream publications, the album received an average score of 84, based on 23 reviews, indicating "widespread critical acclaim". Stereogum awarded it as their album of the week, with Tom Breihan deeming it as "a towering achievement of an album." Treble Zine also labeled it as the album of the week, with Jackie Im stating: "Underlying is a desire to privilege her own voice, which is a lot of what makes Kelela's music so urgent." The New York Times critic Jon Pareles wrote, "The songs are intricately plotted to give the illusion of being impulsive and obsessive, buffeted by shifting emotions: by turns sensual and wary, vulnerable and guarded, leisurely and urgent." Kyle Mullin of Exclaim! praised the album, stating that "Take Me Apart is a subtle, sexy LP from a woman who knows what she wants, and clearly aims to write anthems for fans feeling the same way." Maura Johnston of Rolling Stone described the album as "forward-thinking R&B," and called it "restlessly innovative."

NMEs Nick Levine said "nothing about this lush and accomplished album suggests Kelela is an artist who wants to repeat herself." Julianne Escobedo Shepherd of Pitchfork said that Kelela "might be singing about different partners, but it's the value and dignity she gives to her feelings that provides the true backdrop on Take Me Apart. In the process of setting out to solidify her own sound, Kelela has finally fallen for herself." The Skinnys Nadia Younes wrote, "Take Me Apart may not appear as immediately interesting and unique as her previous work but there are layers upon layers of elements to be explored, digested and, ironically enough, taken apart." Rachel Aroesti from The Guardian said "Kelela's vocal stops Take Me Apart ending up as a fragmented series of sounds: consistently exquisite as it dances between lovesick confusion and shrewd sensuality." Spins Brian Josephs wrote, "Kelela proudly stands within the genre's tradition. For the most part, she avoids making any grandstanding romantic or political statements, but Take Me Apart finds its purpose within the subdued complexities."

AllMusic's Andy Kellman compared it favorably to its predecessor, claiming "Like Cut 4 Me, Take Me Apart is predominantly electronic and progressive R&B, one moment as dreamlike and fevered as an intense courtship, then as startling and chilling as a breakup. It's more composed, less pieced together, with mixtape and EP collaborators Jam City, Ariel Rechtshaid, and Arca primary among a comparatively supplemental and mostly new crew of associates. This also comes across more as a work of in-person interaction than one of distanced communication." In his rave review for Spectrum Culture, Jake Cole wrote Kelela "gave the impression of immediately finding her groove with cutting edge electronic backing, sharp songwriting and a powerful voice. Yet the leap from Cut 4 Me and Hallucinogen to Take Me Apart is as impressive in its own way as the growth toward Homogenic. Though technically Kelela's full-length debut, the album feels like a next step, proof that her striking sound was no mere gimmick but instead the foundation for one of the most advanced, daring artists in contemporary pop. By the time her emotional journey crests with the hopeful closer "Altadena," Kelela gives the impression not only of being more secure in love but in her own skin, firmly on the same wavelength with her collaborators, more capable than ever of pushing boundaries with her work."

Accolades

Track listing

Notes
  signifies an additional producer

Personnel
Credits adapted from the liner notes of Take Me Apart.

 Kelela – vocals, executive production
 Ariel Rechtshaid – production , additional production , executive production
 Arca – production , additional production 
 Jam City – production , executive production
 Jessica Chambliss – background vocal arrangement and vocal production , background vocals 
 Kwes – mixing, additional production and instrumentation 
 Bok Bok – production , additional production 
 Dubbel Dutch – production 
 Kingdom – production 
 Mocky – production 
 Aaron David Ross – production 
 Al Shux – production 
 Asma Maroof – additional production 
 Loric Sih – additional production 
 Terror Danjah – additional production 
 Nick Weiss – additional production 
 Kelsey Lu – cello 
 Alex Hayes – percussion engineering 
 Matt Mysko – assistant engineering
 Marta Salogni – additional mixing 
 Dave Kutch – mastering
 Mischa Notcutt – art direction
 Kit Mason – design
 Daniel Sannwald – photography

Charts

References

2017 debut albums
Albums produced by Arca (musician)
Albums produced by Ariel Rechtshaid
Albums produced by Jam City
Albums produced by Kwes
Kelela albums
Warp (record label) albums